Egon Piechaczek (November 16, 1931 in Chorzow, Poland – October 23, 2006 ) was a Polish former footballer and football manager.

Career
He played for AKS Chorzów, Wawel Kraków, Legia Warsaw, Ruch Chorzów, Odra Opole and FSV Frankfurt.

Coaching career
He coached Kaiserslautern and Arminia Bielefeld in Germany. He was involved in the 1971 Bundesliga scandal. He later coached PAOK, Panionios and Apollon Limassol.

References

1931 births
2006 deaths
Polish footballers
Polish football managers
Polish expatriate footballers
Polish expatriate football managers
Legia Warsaw players
Odra Opole players
Ruch Chorzów players
FSV Frankfurt players
Expatriate footballers in Germany
Expatriate football managers in Germany
Expatriate football managers in Greece
Expatriate football managers in Cyprus
Polish expatriate sportspeople in Germany
Polish expatriate sportspeople in Greece
Polish expatriate sportspeople in Cyprus
1. FC Kaiserslautern managers
Arminia Bielefeld managers
PAOK FC managers
Panionios F.C. managers
Apollon Limassol FC managers
Sportspeople from Chorzów
People from Silesian Voivodeship (1920–1939)
Association football forwards